3L or 3-L may refer to:

3L, or Economic Synergy, a political group in Hong Kong
Third (final) year law school student in the United States 
Federal Election Commission (FEC) Form 3L, or Report of Contributions Bundled by Lobbyists, in which federal campaigns and committees must disclose certain contributions received to the FEC at regular intervals
3L, a model of the 4-cylinder diesel Toyota L engine
Ford 3L GT or F3L, a sports prototype racing car model introduced in March 1968
Bentley 3L or Bentley 3 Litre, a 1920s sports car
SSH 3L or Secondary State Highway 3L, a road which became Washington State Route 126
Lupo 3L, a model of the Volkswagen Lupo automobile
SEAT Arosa 3L, a model of the SEAT Arosa automobile
Curtiss HS-3L, a single-engined patrol flying boat built for the United States Navy during World War I

See also
L3 (disambiguation)